The 1910 Tennessee gubernatorial election was held on November 8, 1910. Republican nominee Ben W. Hooper defeated Democratic nominee Robert Love Taylor with 51.89% of the vote. Taylor was nominated after incumbent governor Malcolm R. Patterson withdrew from the contest, while Hooper had defeated Taylor's brother Alfred A. Taylor for the Republican nomination.

General election

Candidates
Major party candidates
Ben W. Hooper, Republican
Robert Love Taylor, Democratic 

Other candidates
Seth McCallen, Socialist

Results

References

1910
Tennessee
Gubernatorial